Cyana hecqi is a moth of the family Erebidae. It was described by Timm Karisch and Ugo Dall'Asta in 2010. It is found in the Democratic Republic of the Congo and Rwanda.

References

Cyana
Moths described in 2010
Erebid moths of Africa